Consuelo Ynares-Santiago (born October 5, 1939) is a former Associate Justice of the Supreme Court of the Philippines. She was appointed  to the Court by President Joseph Estrada.

Profile
Appointed on April 6, 1999, Justice Ynares-Santiago is the first female member of the Supreme Court who rose from the ranks, having begun her career as a municipal judge.
  
A product of the UP College of Law where she graduated in 1962, Justice Santiago started her career in the judiciary in 1973 when she was appointed Municipal Judge of Cainta, Rizal, a position she held for thirteen years. In November 1986, she was appointed Regional Trial Court Judge of Makati where she remained until her appointment to the Court of Appeals in 1990.

Private life
A native of Binangonan, Rizal, where she was born on October 5, 1939, Santiago received from that city in 1994 the Pambayang Gawad Palosebo, the highest municipal award given to outstanding citizens of Binangonan who have excelled in their professions and are role models for the youth.

Family
Consuelo is the daughter of Casimiro Ynares Sr, and Consolacion Y. Martin (both deceased). She was married to Atty. Francisco B. Santiago (founder of law firm, "FB Santiago, Nalus and Associates") until his death in July 1996 from a heart attack. Her daughter, Atty. Pura Angelica Y. Santiago is the managing partner of the Santiago, Cruz, and Sarte Law Offices. Her other children are Dr. Jonas  Francisco, Regina Carmela and Jennylind Allison. Early in 2003, her son Dr. Jonas Santiago (of St. Luke's Hospital, Quezon City), supervised the removal of one of her kidneys at the Philippine Kidney Center.

Bribery allegations 
A still unresolved controversy over alleged bribery of Ynares-Santiago began in September 2007 when Amado “Jake” Macasaet wrote a story in his column for Malaya newspaper. He wrote that P10 million was delivered to a female supreme court justice and mistakenly opened by one of her staff members named Cecilia. There were five female supreme court justices at the time, but the circumstances (notably that she was the only one with a staff member named Cecilia—Daisy Cecilia Muñoz Delis) quickly made it clear that Ynares-Santiago was the target of Macasaet's column.

Macasaet alleged that the bribes were related to decisions on two cases before the judiciary, and that Cecilia was fired for having mistakenly opened them. Ynares-Santiago denied all the charges, and was supported in that denial by Delis. Delis said she never opened a box containing money intended for Ynares-Santiago, and that she had simply retired from her position. Others, including Senator Miriam Defensor Santiago (no relation) have suggested that the charges are unfounded and intended to smear Ynares-Santiago and the entire judiciary in the interest of influencing other cases. Many others in and out of the judiciary have come to Ynares-Santiago's defense, calling her a “model of probity and integrity.

An investigation into the allegations was started in late 2007. But its efforts were complicated when two of the three members of the investigation (both retired justices) left the investigation in Nov 2007, citing personal issues. Macasaet was asked to reveal his sources by the investigation, and in August 2008 was convicted of contempt of court for refusing. He cited free speech and the right not to reveal a journalist’s source.

Some notable opinions 
 Gamboa v. Aguirre (1999) — on right of a provincial Vice-Governor to preside over local council meetings while concurrently Acting Governor.
 Garcia v. Corona (1999)  — on constitutionality of Oil Deregulation Law
 Estrada v. Desierto (2001) - Separate Opinion — on the validity of assumption to the presidency of Gloria Macapagal Arroyo
 People v. Lacson (2003) - Dissenting Opinion — on reinstitution of criminal cases for murder against Senator Panfilo Lacson
 People v. Genosa (2004) - Dissenting Opinion — on “battered women syndrome" as a defense in trial for spousal parricide (joined by C.J. Davide, J. Sandoval-Gutierrez and Austria-Martinez).
 Tenebro v. CA (2004) — on whether the annulment of the second marriage affects criminal liability for bigamy
 People v. Mojello (2004) — on right of an accused to an independent counsel of his own choice
 Agabon v. CA (2004) — on notice requirement for dismissals of employees for "just causes"
 In re: Habeas Corpus for Reynaldo de Villa (2004) — on propriety of writ of habeas corpus as a means to collect DNA evidence from a detained prisoner
 Ledesma v. CA (2005) - on authority of Ombudsman to dismiss local government officials
 HENRY T. GO vs. 5th Div. Sandiganbayan - on RA 3019, Sec. 3(g) applies only to public officers.

References

External links 
Justice Consuelo Ynares-Santiago (Official Supreme Court Webpage)
Passion for Justice
Database, Personal Information

Associate Justices of the Supreme Court of the Philippines
1939 births
Living people
20th-century Filipino lawyers
21st-century Filipino lawyers
University of the Philippines alumni
Filipino women judges
People from Rizal
Justices of the Court of Appeals of the Philippines
20th-century women judges
21st-century women judges